Warhammer Fantasy Roleplay or Warhammer Fantasy Role-Play (abbreviated to WFRP or WHFRP) is a role-playing game set in the Warhammer Fantasy setting, published by Games Workshop or its licensees.

The first edition of WFRP was published in 1986 and later maintained by Hogshead Publishing. A second edition developed by Green Ronin Publishing was published in 2004 by Black Industries. Fantasy Flight Games published a third edition under licence in November 2009. This edition used a new system retaining few mechanics of the original. A fourth edition rooted in the first and second editions was released under licence by Cubicle 7 in 2018.

Publishing history

First edition

Warhammer Fantasy Roleplay was first published in 1986 by Games Workshop. The product was intended as an adjunct to the Warhammer Fantasy Battle tabletop game. A number of GW publications – such as the Realm of Chaos titles – included material for WFRP and  WFB (and the science fiction Warhammer 40K setting), and a conversion system for WFB was published with the WFRP rules. Following the publication of the popular The Enemy Within campaign series and a small number of additional supplements (including a character pack, Gamemaster's screen, and the aforementioned Realm of Chaos books), Games Workshop made the decision to refocus its business. It had found that the miniatures business was much more profitable than pure publishing; WFRP sold very few miniatures, and adding WFRP material to WFB and Warhammer 40,000 supplements had done little to boost the sales of those products.

Publication of WFRP material was turned over to Flame Publications, a division of Games Workshop focused exclusively on roleplaying, in 1989. Flame published a new series of adventures – the Doomstones campaign adapted from a set of Advanced Dungeons & Dragons modules written by a freelancer – and published the first issue of what was intended to become a monthly or quarterly publication, Warhammer Companion. In 1992, following financial problems, Flame ceased operations. Fan websites continued to publish new material and adaptations of Warhammer Fantasy Battle materials, but no new official material appeared for several years.

Nexus Editrice, one of the main RPG publishers in Italy, asked for a licence from Games Workshop. The game was out of print in English, but Nexus acquired the licence and reissued the edition in Italian – editing the text and including new artwork by artists such as Paolo Parente. The game was released in Spring 1994 and won the Best of Show prize at the Lucca Games show, the main game fair in Italy. It had several reprints, both hardback and paperback, and it was followed by the translation of the Enemy Within campaign, a Warhammer Compendium, a Warhammer collection of 28 issues in Italian newspaper kiosks with stories, an Encyclopaedia Albionica about the world of Warhammer and a Warhammer Adventures original board game. This success helped bring new licences soon after, including German and Czech ones, which used Nexus's layout and artwork.

In 1995, British publishing house Hogshead Publishing received a licence to publish new and reprinted WFRP material. Hogshead published a revised edition of the main WFRP rulebook, as well as reprints of the Enemy Within campaign. New supplements also appeared, including the Realms of Sorcery magic supplement and a number of new adventures. Hogshead was subject to a number of restrictions in its rights regarding the WFRP licence; Games Workshop retained extensive editorial control over the line, wanting to ensure that new WFRP material did not contradict the tone and details of the Warhammer Fantasy Battle line.

In 2002, Hogshead owner James Wallis sold his business and returned the WFRP licence to Games Workshop, leaving the future of the game in doubt. Several Hogshead projects were abandoned, including a Skaven supplement and a complete rewrite of the final episode of the Enemy Within campaign.

Second edition
Black Industries, a newly created division of GW's Black Library publishing arm, oversaw the publishing and distribution of a new second edition of Warhammer Fantasy Roleplay, designed by Green Ronin Publishing. The second edition uses the same basic system as the first, but revised and updated a number of features of the system  including replacing the magic system. The new WFRP also brought the setting up to date with the developments in background story that had taken place in the Warhammer Fantasy Battle game setting since the first edition placing the events of the new edition after the WFB 2004 "Storm of Chaos" campaign. The new rulebook was released in March 2005, followed by supplements and sourcebooks, including a new epic campaign (the Paths of the Damned series); monster, equipment and setting supplements; and a number of stand-alone adventures.

Black Industries announced in January 2008 that it would be exiting the roleplaying game market. The Thousand Thrones Campaign was their final WFRP publication. In 2008, Fantasy Flight Games (FFG) acquired the exclusive rights to publish board games, card games and role-playing games based on Games Workshop properties, including WFRP. FFG released the Career Compendium and Shades of Empire for the second edition.

Third edition
On 12 August 2009, Fantasy Flight Games announced a 3rd edition for immediate release, packaged as a single box containing four rulebooks, over 300 cards and counters, and three sets of 12 custom dice. One year later FFG released the rules in standalone books (and PDFs).

On 12 August 2014, Fantasy Flight Games announced that the third-edition product line was "complete" and that no further products would be released for it. In September 2016, the companies announced an end to their licensing agreement. All Games Workshop-licensed FFG products were discontinued at the end of February 2017.

Fourth edition

On 24 May 2017, GW and Cubicle 7 announced a fourth edition of WFRP, saying it would take "its direction from the first and second editions of the game". The fourth edition was released in digital formats in August 2018 with physical release in November 2018.

Setting

Warhammer Fantasy Roleplay shares the same doom-laden background as the Warhammer Fantasy Battle (WFB) wargame, with a focus on the Empire. Since it is a game devoted to individual characters rather than to entire armies, WFRP depicts the setting in much closer detail than its wargame counterpart. This change of focus also results in a more grim and perilous game.

The primary setting of WFRP is the Empire, a region of the "Old World" which based loosely on the Holy Roman Empire, with a number of baronies, counties and dukedoms fashioned after the fiefs of elector counts and dukes. Bordering regions include "Bretonnia" (medieval France, later reinvented using strong Arthurian mythology themes); "Kislev", based on medieval Poland and Imperial Russia; and the "Wasteland ", whose sole city of Marienburg is based on the Low Countries. Other lands mentioned include the fragmented lands of 'Estalia' and 'Tilea' (Spain and the city-states of Renaissance Italy respectively), and 'Araby', a mixture of the Arabic Caliphate and Persia. Other lands with real-life analogies include 'Cathay' (China), 'Khuresh' (Southeast Asia), 'Nippon' (Japan), 'Ind' (India), Naggaroth (northern North America), 'Ulthuan' (Atlantis), 'Lustria' (Mesoamerica), 'Norsca' (Scandinavia) and the island of 'Albion' (British Isles); however, very little official information has been released for these locales.

While the setting of Warhammer Fantasy Roleplay shares traits, such as the existence of elves and goblins, with other popular fantasy settings, it is technologically set slightly later than classic fantasy, closer to the early Renaissance era in terms of technology and society. Firearms are readily available, though expensive and unreliable, and a growing mercantile middle class challenges the supremacy of the nobility.

One of the most identifiable features of the Warhammer setting is Chaos. While the forces of Chaos in Warhammer Fantasy Battle are depicted primarily in the form of marauding dark knights and beastmen, Chaos in WFRP is an insidious force gnawing at the fabric of society. Secret cults abound among all strata of society, seeking to overthrow the social order or to further their own power. Mutants lurk in the forests outside the great cities, while the Skaven (a race of mutated humanoid rats) tunnel beneath them.

Magic is widely feared and reviled, and not without reason. Magic is derived from – and thus corrupted by – Chaos, and its practitioners tread a fine line between death or corruption and relative safety.

System

Combat in Warhammer Fantasy Roleplay was adapted from the large-scale miniature combat of Warhammer Fantasy Battle. It is more 'deadly' than other contemporary systems. Most human-level creatures and characters can take only one or two hits before receiving a serious injury or a "Critical Hit" that may instantly kill, cripple, or permanently maim a character. There are no regeneration or resurrection powers in WFRP and limited healing options. A limited number of "Fate Points", which represent a character's fate or destiny, offset this in giving opportunities to avoid crippling or killing results.

Careers
A central feature of all editions of Warhammer Fantasy Roleplay is the career system.  Characters advance by taking on a career that provide access to a series of new or improved skills and bonuses to attributes (called "advances"). The career has requirements (acquiring tools of the trade, etc.) to be completed as part of the development before moving on to another career; some careers are pre-requisites for subsequent careers. The careers reflect the late medieval/early Renaissance setting of the Old World. There are "basic" careers for low level characters and advanced careers giving access to higher skills and bonuses. The initial career establishes the character before they embarked on a career as an adventurer (working as a baker, night watchman, rat catcher, or farmer). Thereafter the career is the occupation during and between adventures (thief, wizard's apprentice, druid), as well as how the character has changed and developed through their career (becoming a mercenary, explorer, or ship's captain).

First edition
The set of numbers describing a character's abilities in the first edition is closely based on early versions of Warhammer Fantasy Battle. The same basic array of characteristics (Movement, Weapon Skill, Ballistic Skill, Strength, Toughness, Wounds (hit points), Initiative, Attacks, Dexterity, Leadership, Intelligence, Cool, Willpower, and Fellowship) is employed for both games. More detail and differentiation between characters than is required in a wargame is provided by using a percentile (1-100) scale for the skill-based characteristics instead of a decile (1-10) scale.

Second edition
The second edition had every primary ("Main") characteristic on the 1-100 scale, with the tens digit of these values still corresponding to WFB's traits' values where required. For instance, a Strength value of 42% means your "Strength Bonus" is 4, which is directly comparable to WFB. Characteristics are tested using percentile dice, with penalties or bonuses applied to the roll or the target value according to various favourable and unfavourable circumstances.

The eight Main characteristics (rated from 01 to 100) were Weapon Skill (melee weapons), Ballistic Skill (ranged weapons), Strength (physical power), Toughness (physical resistance), Agility (physical aptitude), Intelligence (mental aptitude), Willpower (mental resistance), and Fellowship (social aptitude). The Secondary characteristics (rated from 1 to 10 or more) were Attacks (combat actions per turn), Wounds (hit points), Strength Bonus (combat attacks), Toughness Bonus (combat defence), Magic, Insanity Points, and Fate Points. Dexterity was renamed to Agility, Leadership was merged with Fellowship, and Cool was merged with Willpower.

Magical abilities (called 'spells') were  focussed more on affect individuals rather than battlefield units as in first edition. The 'magic points' of first edition were replaced by a risk of manifestations of Chaos from using magic that could brand the character as a witch. Each school of magic had its own signature spells, giving different abilities and strengths to the various spellcasters.

Insanity Points are similar to Sanity points in the Call of Cthulhu RPG. These are accumulated by being exposed to stressful events: being wounded in combat, catching a disease, witnessing the gruesome deaths of others, or being exposed to Chaos. They may be lowered by taking a permanent mental disadvantage.

Fate Points are spent to re-roll a major fumble or unfavourable result (usually something that ended in their death). Characters receive a few at character creation and rarely get a chance to earn new ones in-game. Fortune Points (used to re-roll minor fumbles) are renewable, but can only be played once per session. They are equal to five times the current number of Fate Points the character has. The player has to decide whether they want to permanently spend a Fate Point or temporarily spend a Fortune Point to deal with a problem.

Another change is switching to a more consistent set of dice used. For instance, you add a D10 to the damage of an attack instead of the D6 used in First Edition.

Third edition

Fantasy Flight Games implemented a completely new set of rules for the third edition.

Dice pools of special dice (unique to this game) replaced the percentile system of previous editions. This system allowed multi-faceted outcome to dice rolls - the character could succeed at a task, while still triggering problems and penalties at the same time.

The Characteristics were reduced to six in three pairs of similar physical and mental concepts: Strength (physical power), Intelligence (mental power), Toughness (physical endurance), Willpower (mental endurance), Agility (physical aptitude), and Fellowship (social aptitude). The two former Characteristics were demoted to Characteristic-based skills: Ballistic Skill was placed under Agility and Weapon Skill was placed under Strength. Insanity Points (how mentally ill the character has become) were replaced by Corruption (how tainted the character's soul is).

The new system comes with several tokens and cards. Tokens represent any status conditions (Stress or Fatigue) the characters have. Two-dimensional standups were used for the players, enemies and monsters for ease of use on a battlemap. The cards contain text describing and explaining the characters' Actions and Talents. There were also decks covering Wounds, Insanity, and Diseases that detailed their in-game effects, the latter commonly induced through spells or monster attacks in the body horror-themed Warhammer universe. The intention was to speed play by having the information at hand rather than referencing the rulebook.

The character sheets were printed on cardstock in a landscape layout. There were large rectangular Race and Career cards detailing the character's base Racial Talents and Career Advances. The sheet and cards were designed to be placed next to each other for ease of play.

The base game came with Human (Reiklander), Dwarf (Karak Azgarad), High Elf and Wood Elf racial templates. (The Halfling and Ogre racial templates were later released in an expansion.) The Humans and Dwarves were subdivided into regional archetypes depending on which province of the Empire or Dwarf stronghold they came from. Each Human or Dwarf regional archetype is granted different focuses, advantages, and Special Abilities because of their cultural outlook.

The Career cards have a title (the name of the Career), whether it is Basic or Advanced, and what race or races may enter it. There are four attributes listed under it (like Basic, Menial, or Bureaucrat) that help in plotting a career path. They have a list of two Primary Characteristics, four or five Career Skills, and a four-piece Stance Meter diagram to show how conservative or reckless the career is. There are also slots for placing Focus, Tactic and/or Reputation cards; the player can only play one card of the appropriate type in each Career slot and have to take an action to switch it out. Each Career card held 10 Advance points worth of Skills, Action or Talent cards, bonus Wound Resistance points, and/or extra Fortune and Stance dice. When the Career's Advances are all purchased, the player has to select and buy a new Career. A new career costs 1 to 4 Advantage points; the cost depends on how many of the four Career attributes the new Career has in common with the old one.

Each Career has an associated career Ability card granting special bonuses. If a character completes the Career, they get to keep the Ability card associated with it. If they switch to a new career before completing it, they forfeit the old Ability card but use the Ability of their new career.

A new mechanic focused on party cohesion using "party sheets". The mechanism allowed characters to share an ability or power that a single character possessed so that anyone in the party can benefit from it. In addition to sharing talents, each party sheet included a specific bonus ability and negative effects.

The Stance Meter was a game mechanic that was a combination turn counter and status marker. It was a set of square puzzle pieces that connected to a central hub. The left-hand squares with a green centre represented the Conservative Stance and the right-hand squares with a red centre represented the Reckless Stance. A player could convert 8-sided blue Characteristic dice into 10-sided green Conservative or red Reckless Stance dice by moving their Activation Counter from the neutral middle over to the Conservative left or Reckless right position. Both grant higher potential outcomes, but Conservative dice have a potential time penalty and Reckless dice have a potential stress or fatigue penalty. Once the character is off the centre, the player has to move back space by space to return to neutral or use the opposite Stance. To aid play, green and red cardboard ovals were provided that fit over the character or opponent standups to indicate their current Stance.

Fourth edition
The mechanics of the fourth edition reverts to the percentile mechanics of the first and second editions, instead of the custom dice pools of the third.

Characters are now much more free to advance their Characteristics and Skills independently of their careers, and the cost in experience points scale with higher numbers.

Skill usage (especially in combat situations) is expanded with the concept of 'advantage', where continued success grants cumulative bonuses.

Wizardly magic keeps many spells of second edition, but integrates the casting mechanism into the overall task resolution system.

Fourth edition is the first to offer guidelines on downtime – what happens between adventures.

Reception
In the August 1987 edition of Dragon (Issue 124), Ken Rolston compared it very favourably to other fantasy role-playing games on the market, saying "WFR deliberately aims at adventures and settings with a less elevated tone... This shift in emphasis from genteel to grubby, gory fantasy, and the simplicity of the tactical and magic systems, are distinctive assets of WFR as it competes for a slice of the [fantasy role-playing game] audience." Rolston called the character generation system "interesting and original", and the character advancement system "flexible and informal". Rolston also liked the monsters encountered, describing them as "charming — and visually compelling — intelligent monster antagonists... well illustrated and often supplied with dramatic and humorous backgrounds." He called the setting the best part of the game, admiring the "epic theme of the Taint of Chaos." Rolston reserved his only strong criticism for the magic system, saying it was "relatively limited and unexciting", although he did see it inevitable in a game that was relatively magic-poor. He concluded with a strong recommendation, saying, "Warhammer Fantasy Roleplay is strongly recommended for gamers in search of a fantasy system and campaign background, or in search of elements to steal and add to their current system and campaign. Its systems, presentation, and campaign setting are superior, and the campaign supplement/adventure support looks promising. Its strengths, when compared to other popular FRPG designs, are the simplicity of its systems, its support of grotesque and macabre themes, and the distinctive flavor of its campaign setting."

In the December 1987 issue of The Games Machine (#2), John Woods liked the look of the book, but soon found a lot of typos and a lack of organization, commenting, "The rulebook has a rushed feel to it, with some sections ill-organised, and several misprints." Woods also found the rules overly simplistic, especially a combat system where, instead of accumulating gradual damage, a character was either entirely alive and unwounded or, after taking any damage, completely dead. He concluded, "Probably not a system with much to offer the experienced RPGer, but straightforward and detailed enough to give good value to beginners or those moving into RPGs from wargaming."  In issue #19, Woods reviewed the paperback edition, and concluded "There are a few shortcomings which mean it won't be everyone’s cup of troll stew, but it's excellent value for money and should appeal to roleplaying newcomers in particular."

In a 1996 reader poll conducted by Arcane magazine to determine the 50 most popular roleplaying games of all time, Warhammer Fantasy Roleplay was ranked fourth. Editor Paul Pettengale commented, "Warhammer Fantasy Roleplay is an extremely atmospheric game to play in", and described the game as feeling like a cross-breed between Dungeons & Dragons and Call of Cthulhu, saying "if you've played these other two games, you can probably imagine what a superb mix that can be."

Reviews
Pyramid

Awards
At the 2005 ENnie Awards, 
The second edition's core rulebook, Warhammer Fantasy Roleplay, won Gold for "Best Production Values" and "Best Game". 
 Old World Bestiary, the second edition's primary adversary publication, also won Gold in for "Best Adversary / Monster Product".

At the 2019 ENnie Awards, the fourth edition's core rulebook won Gold for "Best Writing".

See also
List of Warhammer Fantasy Roleplay publications
Zweihander Grim and Perilous RPG - A game based on the rules set of Warhammer Fantasy Roleplay (2nd edition), but with rules tweaks and the Warhammer gameworld removed.

Notes

References

External links
Warhammer Fantasy Roleplay

 
British role-playing games
Dark fantasy role-playing games
ENnies winners
Fantasy Flight Games games
Green Ronin Publishing games
Role-playing games based on works
Role-playing games introduced in 1986